The Lyakhovsky Islands are the southernmost group of the New Siberian Islands in the Arctic seas of eastern Russia. 
The islands are named in honour of Ivan Lyakhov, who explored them in 1773.

Geography
They are separated from the mainland by the Laptev Strait ( wide), and from the Anzhu Islands group by the Sannikov Strait ( wide). Two islands dominate the group:

Maly Lyakhovsky Island (Little Lyakhovsky Island) 
Stolbovoy is a large island detached from the group.
Off Great Lyakhovsky Island's southwestern cape lies a small islet called Ostrov Khopto-Terer.
Semyonovsky Island has now disappeared after heavy erosion. Before its disappearance, it was at 4 km2, one of the smallest islands in the archipelago.

In popular culture
Part of the action of two novels by Jules Verne, Waif of the Cynthia (1885) and César Cascabel (1890), takes place there. In the latter, the term "Liakhov Islands" refers to the New Siberian group as a whole, as the principal action is on Kotelny Island.

References

External links

 
Archipelagoes of the East Siberian Sea
Archipelagoes of the Laptev Sea
New Siberian Islands
Archipelagoes of the Sakha Republic
Islands of Siberia
Uninhabited islands of Russia